Spike Magazine is an internet cultural journal which began in 1995, founded by its editor Chris Mitchell in Brighton, England. Updated monthly, its motto is "picking the brains of popular culture", though it has an intellectual inclination.

Description
The focus of the magazine is mainly literary, and it features an extensive and eclectic back catalogue of book reviews, all available from the site's front page. It also includes features on a variety of subjects (including cinema and politics),  music reviews, interviews, and the ongoing "blog" journal Splinters

Spike has had contributors from around the world over the years making for very varied outlooks. The general tone however tends towards the counter-cultural, controversial and left-wing, with a frequent championing of lesser-known writers. Nonetheless, Spike has managed to obtain interviews with a variety of big-name authors over the years, including J. G. Ballard, Will Self, Jeff Noon, Iain Banks, Hubert Selby Jr, Gitta Sereny, P. J. O'Rourke, Quentin Crisp, Nick Hornby, and Julie Burchill.

It contains separate sections devoted to news on Ballard, Noon, Self and Irvine Welsh.

Some of the main writers over the years have been Chris Mitchell himself, Stephen Mitchelmore, Ben Granger, Ismo Santala (the former three also having been regular contributors to the Splinters blog), Chris Hall, Gary Marshall, Eric Saeger, Ian Hocking, Robin Askew, Nick Clapson, Jayne Margetts, Craig Johnson, Katrina Gulliver, Nathan Cain, Nick Clapson, Dan Coxon and Adam Baron.

Spike Magazine ceased to run new articles in 2012, but the archive is still available online.

External links
 Spike Magazine
 Splinters
 britlitblogs.com
In October 2010, a free 600 page PDF anthology of the best of Spike Magazine was made available to download from the site.

Independent Spike media profiles
Good Web Guide overview
Writers Reign overview
Zine-o-Rama overview
Complete Review overview

1995 establishments in the United Kingdom
Defunct literary magazines published in the United Kingdom
Online magazines published in the United Kingdom
Book review magazines
British literature websites
Magazines established in 1995
Cultural magazines published in the United Kingdom
Magazines disestablished in 2012
Mass media in East Sussex